Androstanolone enanthate (brand name Anaboleen Depot), also known as stanolone enanthate or dihydrotestosterone heptanoate (DHTH), as well as 5α-androstan-17β-ol-3-one 17β-heptanoate, is a synthetic androgen and anabolic steroid and a dihydrotestosterone ester. It is used as an injectable and acts as a prodrug of androstanolone (stanolone, dihydrotestosterone, DHT). The drug has been studied in and found to be effective in the treatment of gynecomastia in boys and adult men. The pharmacology of androstanolone enanthate has been studied.

See also
 List of androgen esters § Dihydrotestosterone esters

References

Androgens and anabolic steroids
Androstanes
Dihydrotestosterone esters
Enanthate esters
Prodrugs